{{DISPLAYTITLE:Indium (111In) satumomab pendetide}}

Indium (111In) satumomab pendetide (trade name OncoScint CR103) is a mouse monoclonal antibody which is used for cancer diagnosis. The antibody, satumomab, is linked to pendetide, a derivative of DTPA. Pendetide acts as a chelating agent for the radionuclide indium-111.

References

External links 
 Drugs.com Satumomab pendetide

Radiopharmaceuticals
Antibody-drug conjugates
Indium compounds